Clivina subterranea is a species of ground beetle in the subfamily Scaritinae. It was described by Decu, Nitzu & Juberthie in 1994.

References

subterranea
Beetles described in 1994